Senator Garfield may refer to:

James A. Garfield (1831–1881), Ohio State Senate
James Rudolph Garfield (1865–1950), Ohio State Senate